Campylocheta is a genus of flies in the family Tachinidae.

Species

Campylocheta abdominalis Shima, 1985
Campylocheta albiceps Macquart, 1851
Campylocheta ancisa Reinhard, 1952
Campylocheta angustifrons Mesnil, 1952
Campylocheta aperta Dear & Crosskey, 1982
Campylocheta argenticeps Shima, 1985
Campylocheta atriceps Reinhard, 1952
Campylocheta bicoloripes Mesnil, 1970
Campylocheta bisetosa Shima, 1985
Campylocheta canora (Reinhard, 1952)
Campylocheta confusa Ziegler, 1996
Campylocheta crassiseta Mesnil, 1974
Campylocheta dentifera Richter, 1981
Campylocheta eudryae (Smith, 1916)
Campylocheta fasciatus Curran, 1938
Campylocheta flaviceps Shima, 1985
Campylocheta fuscinervis (Stein, 1924)
Campylocheta grisea Shima, 1985
Campylocheta heteroneura Brauer & von Bergenstamm, 1891
Campylocheta hirticeps Shima, 1985
Campylocheta inclinata Villeneuve, 1915
Campylocheta inepta (Meigen, 1824)
Campylocheta keiseri Mesnil, 1978
Campylocheta latigena Mesnil, 1974
Campylocheta lipernis Reinhard, 1952
Campylocheta magnicauda Shima, 1988
Campylocheta malaisei (Mesnil, 1953)
Campylocheta membrana Dear & Crosskey, 1982
Campylocheta mariae Bystrowski, 2001
Campylocheta nasellensis (Reinhard, 1952)
Campylocheta orbitalis (Webber, 1931)
Campylocheta orientalis Townsend, 1928
Campylocheta plathypenae (Sabrosky, 1975)
Campylocheta plumbea Mesnil, 1952
Campylocheta polita (Brooks, 1945)
Campylocheta praecox (Meigen, 1824)
Campylocheta rindgei (Reinhard, 1952)
Campylocheta risbeci Mesnil, 1944
Campylocheta semiothisae (Brooks, 1945)
Campylocheta similis Ziegler & Shima, 1996
Campylocheta siphonion Dear & Crosskey, 1982
Campylocheta suwai Shima, 1985
Campylocheta tarsalis Townsend, 1915
Campylocheta teliosis (Reinhard, 1952)
Campylocheta townsendi (Smith, 1916)
Campylocheta umbrinervis Mesnil, 1974
Campylocheta vansomereni Emden, 1960
Campylocheta ziegleri Tschorsnig, 2002

References

Dexiinae
Tachinidae genera
Diptera of Europe
Taxa named by Camillo Rondani